Alka, AlkA or ALKA may refer to:

People 
 Alka Ajith (born c. 1997), Indian multilingual playback singer
 Alka Amin (active from 2011), Indian television actress
 Alka Balram Kshatriya, Indian politician, Member of the Parliament of India representing Gujarat
 Alka Kaushal (born 1969), Indian film actress in Marathi cinema
 Alka Kriplani (active from before 1995), Indian gynecologist, medical writer and academic
 Alka Kubal (active from born 1965), Indian film actress in Marathi cinema
 Alka Lamba (born 1975), Indian politician
 Alka Matewa (born 1987), Belgian mixed martial artist from Democratic Republic of the Congo
 Alka Nath (born 1950), Indian social worker and politician
 Alka Nupur (active from 1981), Indian film actress in Hindi cinema
 Alka Pande (born 1956), Indian art curator
 Alka Rai, Indian politician
 Alka Sadat (born 1981), Afghan documentary and feature film producer, director and cameraman
 Alka Saraogi (born 1960), Indian novelist and short story writer in Hindi
 Alka Singh, an Indian politician
 Alka Tomar (active from 2003), Indian freestyle wrestler who won a gold medal at the 2010 Commonwealth Games
 Alka Verma (active from 2014), Indian actress
 Alka Vuica (born 1961), Croatian singer-songwriter and politician
 Alka Yagnik (born 1966), Indian playback singer in Hindi cinema

Other uses 
 Alka (Baltic religion), a sacred place in Baltic religion
 Alka (insurance), a Danish insurance company
 Alka (Svalbard), a Norwegian island
 ALKA (weapon), a directed-energy weapon
 American Lithuanian Cultural Archives (Lithuanian: Amerikos lietuvių kultūros archyvai), or ALKA, in Putnam, Connecticut, U.S.
 DNA-3-methyladenine glycosylase II, also known as AlkA, an enzyme

See also 
 
 Alka-Seltzer, an effervescent antacid and pain reliever
 Alka-Seltzer Time, a U.S. radio series broadcast 1949–1953
 Hamari Bahu Alka, a 1982 Hindi movie 
 Sinjska alka, an equestrian competition held annually in Sinj, Croatia